Samuel Geoffroy Camille (born 2 February 1986) is a Martiniquais footballer who plays as a left back for French club Olympique de Valence.

He spent his entire professional career in Spain, representing five Segunda División clubs and appearing in 186 matches in the process.

Club career
Born in Saint-Denis, Seine-Saint-Denis, Paris, Camille began his senior career with RC Lens, but spent the vast majority of his four-year spell with the reserves. He made his debut with the first team on 24 September 2008, as a 67th-minute substitute in a 3–0 away win against FC Lorient in the third round of the Coupe de la Ligue.

In June 2009, after an unsuccessful trial with Atlético Madrid, Camille signed a contract with Rayo Vallecano also in Spain, being assigned to the reserve team in Tercera División. He was definitely promoted in September, and made his first appearance with the main squad on 14 November 2009, playing the full 90 minutes in a 2–0 home victory over Real Murcia.

Camille joined fellow Segunda División club Córdoba CF on 8 July 2010, being first choice in his only season. He moved to Granada CF afterwards, being immediately loaned to Andalusia neighbours Cádiz CF in Segunda División B.

On 6 August 2012, Camille signed with second-division AD Alcorcón. After featuring regularly, he agreed to a deal at SD Ponferradina of the same league on 16 July 2014.

Camille scored his only goal as a professional on 1 September 2013, helping hosts Alcorcón defeat Recreativo de Huelva 3–0 after just a few seconds of taking the field. Before leaving Spain at the age of 33, he also had a three-year spell in the second tier with CD Tenerife.

International career
On 20 May 2019, Camille was named to Martinique's 40-man provisional squad for the 2019 CONCACAF Gold Cup, being included in the final team on 7 June. He made his debut in the competition the following week, starting in the 4–0 loss against Canada in the first matchday.

Camille also represented the nation in the 2021 Gold Cup, in another group-stage exit.

References

External links

1986 births
Living people
French people of Martiniquais descent
Sportspeople from Saint-Denis, Seine-Saint-Denis
French footballers
Martiniquais footballers
Association football defenders
RC Lens players
Segunda División players
Segunda División B players
Rayo Vallecano B players
Rayo Vallecano players
Córdoba CF players
Granada CF footballers
Cádiz CF players
AD Alcorcón footballers
SD Ponferradina players
CD Tenerife players
Martinique international footballers
2019 CONCACAF Gold Cup players
2021 CONCACAF Gold Cup players
French expatriate footballers
Expatriate footballers in Spain
French expatriate sportspeople in Spain
Martiniquais expatriate sportspeople in Spain
Footballers from Seine-Saint-Denis